Charles D. Rosa (September 15, 1870 – August 3, 1959) was an American jurist and politician.

Born in the town of Center, Rock County, Wisconsin, Rosa worked on a farm and on the railroad. He went to Evansville Seminary and Beloit Academy. He then graduated from Beloit College. Rosa served as principal of the Edgerton, Wisconsin public schools. Rosa graduated from University of Wisconsin Law School and practiced law in Beloit, Wisconsin; Rosa also taught commercial law at Beloit College. In 1906, Rosa was elected Beloit Municipal Court judge. He also was a farmer and livestock breeder. In 1911 and 1917, Rosa served in the Wisconsin State Assembly and was a Republican. Later, Rosa served as chairman of the Wisconsin Tax Commission. He died in Madison, Wisconsin.

Notes

1870 births
1959 deaths
People from Rock County, Wisconsin
Beloit College alumni
Beloit College faculty
University of Wisconsin Law School alumni
Educators from Wisconsin
Farmers from Wisconsin
Wisconsin lawyers
Wisconsin state court judges
Republican Party members of the Wisconsin State Assembly